Phil Karn (born October 4, 1956) is a retired American engineer from Lutherville, Maryland. He earned a bachelor's degree in electrical engineering from Cornell University in 1978 and a master's degree in electrical engineering from Carnegie Mellon University in 1979. From 1979 until 1984, Karn worked at Bell Labs in Naperville, Illinois, and Murray Hill, New Jersey. From 1984 until 1991, he was with Bell Communications Research in Morristown, New Jersey. From 1991 through to his retirement, he worked at Qualcomm in San Diego, where he specialized in wireless data networking protocols, security, and cryptography.

He is currently the President/CEO of Amateur Radio Digital Communications (ARDC), a non-profit foundation funded by the sale of part of its IP address space (44/8). ARDC manages the remaining portion of its address space by providing financial grants to amateur radio and related groups.

He has been an active contributor in the Internet Engineering Task Force, especially in security, and to the Internet architecture. He is the author or co-author of at least 6 RFCs, and is cited as contributing to many more.  He is the inventor of Karn's Algorithm, a method for calculating the round trip time for IP packet retransmission.  In 1991, Thomas Alexander Iannelli's Master's thesis judged Karn's KA9Q NOS software as more suitable for deployment than an Air Force Institute of Technology packet radio system.  In 1990, Karn was one of the first to predict that the use of wired links for the Internet's "capillaries" would become "history" because most users would access it via wireless radio links.

In 1994, Carl Malamud interviewed Karn on Internet Talk Radio for his "Geek of the Week" podcast.  They talked about the KA9Q software, Qualcomm's CDMA radio technology for data transfer, the Globalstar low Earth orbit satellite radio system, Mobile IP, the Clipper chip, and encryption.  In June 2014, Karn was also interviewed for the History of the Internet Project, in which he described his contribution to the effort to reboot the 1978 International Sun/Earth Explorer-3 (ISEE-3) spacecraft. The ISEE-3 is also known as the International Cometary Explorer.

He is well known in the amateur radio community for his work on the KA9Q Network Operating System (NOS), named after his amateur callsign.  He also created early 9600 bit/s FSK radio modems.  In the early 2000's, Karn worked to introduce forward error correction into Amateur radio satellites, applying it to the 400 bit/s PSK telemetry from the AO-40 satellite.   He won the 1989 Specific Achievement Award at the Dayton Hamvention.

Crypto export lawsuit 
In 1994, the US State Department Office of Defense Trade Control ruled that while it was legal to export Bruce Schneier's "Applied Cryptography" book under the rules for munitions export, it was illegal to export the source code in the book on electronic media such as a floppy disk.  The case was tried in Washington D.C. Federal District Court (1996), and the judge handed down a summary judgment in favor of the State Department.  He ruled that the book and it contents were free to be exported, protected by free speech and press rights.  The floppy disk, however, was a tool or instrument designed to produce functioning products (e.g. an encrypted computer) and as such was subject to the controls of the Export Control Act.  <<http://www.loundy.com/CASES/Karn_v_US.html>>

Karn challenged this ruling, both in the courts and in testimony before Congress for two years, until Bill Clinton dropped almost all export controls on freely available crypto source code on January 14, 2000; the judge mooted the case.

References
http://www.loundy.com/CASES/Karn_v_US.html

Sources 
  : Self-published or questionable sources: http://www.ka9q.net/ is subject's personal web page.

External links
Phil Karn's personal webpages
FEC Encoding for AO-40 Telemetry
Phil Karn's profile on Quora

Living people
Amateur radio people
Packet radio
Cypherpunks
Cornell University College of Engineering alumni
Carnegie Mellon University College of Engineering alumni
People from Baltimore
1956 births